Changhai Airport  is an airport serving Changhai, in the province of Liaoning in the People's Republic of China.

Airlines and destinations
The airport has one daily flight to Dalian Zhoushuizi International Airport. In peak times, like holidays, an additional flight to Dalian Zhoushuizi will be provided.

Facilities
The terminal has traditional ticketing and baggage claim areas. Security checks often proceed on the tarmac, but can also be done inside the terminal in specially marked areas.

References

Airports in Liaoning